William Ross Low (21 September 1889 – 1970) was a Scottish footballer who played in the Scottish Football League for Aberdeen, and in the English Football League for Barnsley.

His uncles Wilf and Harry and cousin Norman were all footballers.

References

1889 births
1970 deaths
Date of death missing
Scottish footballers
Association football wing halves
English Football League players
Scottish Football League players
Aberdeen F.C. players
Gateshead A.F.C. players
Grimsby Town F.C. players
Gainsborough Trinity F.C. players
Wombwell F.C. players
Truro City F.C. players
Footballers from Aberdeen